is a Japanese voice actress who formerly affiliated with Arts Vision and is now affiliated with Amuleto.

Filmography

Television animation
1998
Legend of the Mystical Ninja (Nyanko)
Nessa no Haou Gandalla (Nurse)

2000
Ceres, Celestial Legend (Celestial Maiden)
Strange Dawn (Reika)
Descendants of Darkness (Eileen)
Sci-Fi Harry (Female Student B (eps 1, 3))
Ghost Stories (Momoko Koigakubo)

2001
Comic Party (Child (ep 12), Clerk at Marvel Cafe, Customer (eps 3, 7, 9), Female Student (eps 2, 10), Kazuki's mother, Staff (ep 5))
You're Under Arrest Second Season (Primary School Children)
Offside (Nagisa's Mother)
Fruits Basket (Girl (ep 2))
X (Yuzuriha Nekoi)

2002
Seven of Seven (Akane Sugiyama)
Happy Lesson (Librarians)
Tenchi Muyo! GXP (Kiriko Masaki)
Tokyo Mew Mew (Retasu Midorikawa/Mew Lettuce)

2003
Origami Warriors (Goku Hitsugaya, Nemu Ashikawa, Tomomi Hitsugaya)
Scrapped Princess (Gloria)
Kino's Journey (Mother (ep 4))
Tantei Gakuen Q (Mio Kazama)
Please Twins! (Futaba Mashita)
Gungrave (Mika Asagi)
Peacemaker Kurogane (Yuugao)
Someday's Dreamers (Aya Kikuchi)
Texhnolyze (Michiko Kouda)

2004
Diamond Daydreams (Taiko)
Sgt. Frog
Midori Days (Yuka)
Monster (Edda)
Pugyuru (Mizore)
Otogi Zoshi (Urabe no Suetake)
Desert Punk (Dog Woman)
Black Jack 21 (Princess)
Grenadier (Kasumi)

2005
Bleach (Momo Hinamori)
Peach Girl (Female Student (eps 1–4), Kako (18 episodes))
Koi Koi Seven (Yaki)
Comic Party: Revolution (Yuka Tsukishiro, Miho Hoshino, Yu's Mother, Kuro Mizuki)
Best Student Council (Seina Katsura)
Honey and Clover (Yukie Ishida)
Happy Seven (Tomoya Kuki)
Magical Girl Lyrical Nanoha A's (Sachie Ishida)

2006
Soul Link (Nao Morisaki)
Honey and Clover II (Satsuki-sensei (ep 9))
Tsuyokiss - Cool×Sweet (Inori Ooeyama)
Black Blood Brothers (Sayuka Shirane)
Super Robot Wars OG: Divine Wars (Garnet Sunday)

2007
Shining Tears X Wind (Reia Hiruda)
Kimikiss pure rouge (Koichi's mother)

2008
Bleach (Emilou Apacci)
XxxHOLiC: Kei (Female (ep 10))
Blassreiter (Jil Hoffmann)
Nabari no Ou (Nurse (ep 18))
Slayers Revolution (Maid (ep 10))
Clannad After Story (Talent (ep 11))
Nodame Cantabile: Paris (Elise)

2009
Maria Holic (Tonomura)
Slayers Evolution-R (Chibi Dragon)
Polyphonica Crimson S (Leica)

2010
Ladies versus Butlers! (Mikan)
Uragiri wa Boku no Namae o Shitteiru (Yomi)

2011
Maria Holic Alive (Tonomura)

2012
High School DxD (Karawana)
Senki Zesshō Symphogear (Mother, Woman Girl)

2014
Recently, My Sister Is Unusual (Nanami Akazaka)

2022
Bleach: Thousand-Year Blood War (Momo Hinamori, Emilou Apacci)

OVA
Carnival Phantasm (Ciel, Neco-Arc Babbles)
From I"s (Iori Yoshizuki)
Kagaku Na Yatsura (Touko Hizuki)
Mizuiro (Asami Kōzu)

Video games
Record of Agarest War Zero (Sayane)
Gokujou Seitokai (Seina Katsura)
Lucky Star (Fuyuki Amahara)
Melty Blood (Ciel and Powerd Ciel)
Mizuiro (Asami Kōzu)
Super Robot Wars series (Garnet Sandi, Mimsy Laaz)
The Super Dimension Fortress Macross (PS2 version) (Vanessa Laird)Tokyo Mew Mew (Retasu Midorikawa)Fire Emblem: Akatsuki no megami (Goddess of Dawn)X: Unmei no Sentaku (Yuzuriha Nekoi)Hyperdevotion Noire: Goddess Black Heart (Lady Wac)

Radio dramaFinal Fantasy Tactics Advance'' (Babus Swain)

External links
 

1976 births
Living people
Voice actresses from Chiba Prefecture
Japanese voice actresses
20th-century Japanese actresses
21st-century Japanese actresses
Arts Vision voice actors